The 2013 All Stars Match was the fourth of the annual representative exhibition matches played between the Indigenous All Stars and the NRL All Stars team which was held on 9 February 2013. Once again the players were selected through a voting scheme which over 40,000 fans polled their selections over the two online voting stages. Final stage voting for both sides were closed on the midnight 14 January. After the success of the previous three events the match was moved from Gold Coast's Skilled Park to the larger capacity Suncorp Stadium in Brisbane. The Indigenous All Stars won the match 32–6 to even the ledger with two wins from the four games played so far. Both Ben Barba and Reece Robinson became the first players to score a hat-trick in an All Stars match. The preceding game included a Women's All Stars exhibition match which was won by the NRL Women's All Stars 22-6.

Teams
Benji Marshall (New Zealand captain) and Cameron Smith (Australian captain) were automatic selections for the NRL All Stars side whilst Johnathan Thurston was made captain and an automatic pick for his Indigenous side. After the 16 best voted players for each side were selected by their respective coaches, the coaches were then allowed to personally pick further players to complete their 20-man squads.  An asterisk(*) next to a player's name represents debutants for their respective sides.

1 - Dave Taylor was originally selected to play but withdrew due to injury. He was replaced by Ashley Harrison.
2 - Billy Slater was originally selected to play but withdrew due to injury. He was replaced by Jarryd Hayne whilst Justin O'Neill filled Hayne's spot on the bench.
3 - Cooper Cronk was originally selected to play but withdrew due to injury. He was replaced by Shaun Johnson.
4 - Anthony Watmough was originally selected to play but withdrew due to injury. He was replaced by Kieran Foran.
5 - Paul Gallen was originally selected to play but withdrew due to injury. He was replaced by Chris Heighington.

Result

Women's All Stars match

The NRL announced the Women's and Indigenous Women's All Stars teams to take the field as part of the Harvey Norman Rugby League All Stars match on Saturday 9 February in Brisbane.
This was the Second Women's rugby league match for the women as part of the fixture, with the level of competition stepping up again the following year, thanks to increased women's pathways nationally and female participation levels across the game at an all-time high.

Women's Teams
The two teams were selected and announced in November for the match in February.

Result

References

All Stars Match
Rugby league in Brisbane
NRL All Stars match